Reina Regente was a  protected cruiser of the Spanish Navy. Entering service in 1888, she was  lost in 1895 during a storm in the Gulf of Cádiz while she was travelling from Tangier to Cádiz, Spain.

Construction 

Reina Regente was the first cruiser built of her class. She was laid down on 20 June 1886 and launched on 24 February 1887 at the J&G Thomson shipyard in Govan, United Kingdom. She was completed on 1 January 1888 and named Reina Regente after Maria Christina, queen of Spain, and queen regent during the minority of her son, Alfonso XIII. The cruiser was part of the Spanish Navy from 1888 until her loss in 1895. 

The ship was assessed at 4,725 tons. She had 2 triple expansion engines driving a single screw propeller and 4 cylindrical boilers. The engine was rated at 11.500 nhp.

Fate 

On 10 March 1895, Reina Regente sailed from Tangier (Morocco) to Cádiz (Spain) due the captain wanted to go the launching of the armored cruiser Carlos V in Cádiz the following day, with 420 crew on board under the command of Captain Francisco Sanz de Andino. She was never seen again. A severe storm struck the Gulf of Cádiz during the time she was passing through it. In the following days a search was undertaken in the hope of finding the ship somewhere sheltered in an African port. However, wreckage from the cruiser started to wash up on the beaches of Tarifa and Algeciras. 

The cruiser had disappeared and had probably sunk somewhere in the Gulf of Cádiz with the loss of her entire crew. The current location of the ship is still unknown. This incident remains one of the deadliest shipwrecks of the Spanish Navy.

References

1887 ships
Ships built in Govan
Reina Regente-class cruisers
Shipwrecks of Spain
Shipwrecks in the Atlantic Ocean
Maritime incidents in Spain
Maritime incidents in 1895
Warships lost with all hands
Missing ships